Southern Nash High School is a public high school in Bailey, North Carolina.  It is one of four high schools in Nash-Rocky Mount Public Schools and has the second-largest enrollment of the four.

History
Southern Nash High School was created by the consolidation of Bailey High School, Coopers, Middlesex and Spring Hope school's high school programs. It opened in 1968. The opening of Nash Central High School in 2003 drew off some of its student population.

Curriculum
Southern Nash offers Advanced Placement courses in United States History and English Literature & Composition, as well as online calculus AB.  College-level courses are also available through distance learning and partnerships with Nash Community College and the University of North Carolina - Greensboro.  In 2007, Southern Nash High School surpassed the state average End-of-Course scores in algebra I, algebra II, biology, United States history, and geometry.  Other academic programs at Southern Nash High School include a state recognized Youth Apprenticeship program, an award-winning architectural and graphic arts program, a NATEF certified Auto-Tech program, an aquaculture program, an agricultural program, and Health Science Academy.

Agricultural education
Southern Nash High School is home to one of the largest agriculture programs in the state of North Carolina.  The school has a greenhouse, an aquaculture room, and a pond on campus.  Courses like biotechnology, horticulture, forestry, aquaculture, and animal science are offered through the Agricultural Education program.  Currently, Southern Nash High School boasts an animal collection which consists of snakes, catfish, tilapia, fire belly toads, crickets, giant millipedes from China, a ferret, a cow, turkeys, chickens, and goats.  The Agriculture department is headed by Mike Bartholomew, Nash-Rocky Mount's Teacher of the Year in 2004–2005.

Athletics
Southern Nash is a member of the 3-A Big East athletic conference, which consists of Southern Nash, Nash Central High School, Northern Nash High School, Rocky Mount High School, Fike High School, and Hunt High School.  Northern Nash is considered the school's main rival, but recently Nash Central has also evolved into a rival school.  Southern Nash has won three state championships; one in softball (1995) and two in boys' outdoor track (1998, 1999).  The school has also had 11 individual state champions in sports such as indoor track, outdoor track, wrestling, and boys' tennis.  Under coach Brad Joyner, the boys' tennis team has become a powerhouse over the last decade, and have consistently been voted in the top 10 of the state; in 2008, they reached number one for the first time in school history, and held the spot for over two months.  From 2003–2011, the Firebirds were 89–1 in conference play and won 9 consecutive conference championships. From 2007–2011, they were 93–2 in the regular season, including a 62–0 stretch from 2007–2009.  The tennis team won the 2008 and 2009 Eastern Regional 3-A championships but lost the State Championship match both times to Charlotte Catholic High School and Lake Norman High School, respectively. The football team has also experienced recent success, having advanced to the semifinals of the NCHSAA 3-AA playoffs in 2009 in addition to producing several NCAA Division I football players. In 2012, the boys' soccer team also reached the semifinals of the state playoffs before losing to the eventual champion, Jacksonville High School.

Southern Nash High School offers students a variety of sports, which are divided seasonally.  
Fall sports: 
Boys' cross country
Girls' cross country
Junior varsity and varsity football
Girls' golf
Boys' soccer
Girls' tennis
Junior varsity and varsity volleyball
Junior varsity and varsity cheerleading
Winter sports: 
Boys' junior varsity and varsity basketball
Girls' junior varsity and varsity basketball
Boys' indoor track and field
Girls' indoor track and field
Boys' swimming
Girls' swimming
Wrestling
Spring sports: 
Junior varsity and varsity baseball
Boys' golf
Girls' soccer
Junior varsity and varsity softball
Boys' tennis
Boys' outdoor track and field
Girls' outdoor track and field

Southern Nash High School also had two individual athletes make North Carolina High School Athletic Association (NCHSAA) athlete of the year in 1998 and 1999.

Notable alumni
Zonovan Knight, football running back for NC State
Julius Peppers, former NFL defensive end, 3x first team All-Pro and 9x Pro Bowl selection

References

External links
SNHS/ Southern Nash High School
Southern Nash High School Band

Educational institutions established in 1968
Public high schools in North Carolina
Schools in Nash County, North Carolina